Rankovce may refer to:

 Rankovce Municipality - a municipality in North Macedonia
 Rankovce, North Macedonia - a town in North Macedonia
 Rankovce, Slovakia - a village and municipality in Slovakia